KOCI-LP (101.5 FM) is a low-power FM radio station branded as "101.5 KOCI". This station is broadcasting a Classic rock music format. This station is licensed to Newport Beach, California and is broadcasting to the Orange County area. It can be heard in Costa Mesa, and can reach as far as Westminster, Garden Grove, and Tustin. The station operates at a low power in order to avoid co-channel interference to KGB-FM, in distant San Diego, which also broadcasts at 101.5 FM and airs a Classic Rock format, reaching San Clemente.

History
The original proposal for the station was written by Brian Helvey (current KOCI Director) in 2000.

References

External links
 

OCI-LP
Classic rock radio stations in the United States
OCI-LP